Edgar De Castro (unknown – unknown), was a Filipino chess player, International Arbiter (1990).

Biography
From the begin of 1960s to the mid-1970s Edgar De Castro was one of the leading Filipino chess players. He three times participated in World Chess Championship South-East Asian Zonal tournaments (1966, 1969, 1972). His best result in this tournament was shared 5th–6th place in 1966.

Edgar De Castro played for Philippines in the Chess Olympiads: 
 In 1960, at first reserve board in the 14th Chess Olympiad in Leipzig (+3, =2, -3),
 In 1964, at second reserve board in the 16th Chess Olympiad in Tel Aviv (+2, =4, -4),
 In 1966, at second board in the 17th Chess Olympiad in Havana (+8, =6, -6),
 In 1968, at third board in the 18th Chess Olympiad in Lugano (+4, =3, -5),
 In 1970, at fourth board in the 19th Chess Olympiad in Siegen (+2, =8, -3),
 In 1972, at fourth board in the 20th Chess Olympiad in Skopje (+4, =4, -6).

In 1990, Edgar De Castro was awarded the FIDE International Arbiter (IA) title.

References

External links

Year of birth missing
Year of death missing
Filipino chess players
Chess Olympiad competitors
20th-century chess players